Peter, Paul & Mommy, Too, released on Warner Bros. in 1993, is a children's album by the trio Peter, Paul and Mary. It was recorded on October 31 and November 1, 1992 at the Brooklyn Academy of Music's Harvey Theater (formerly known as the Majestic Theatre). The album follows from the first children's album they released in 1969, Peter, Paul and Mommy.

Track listing 
 "Puff (The Magic Dragon)" (Leonard Lipton, Peter Yarrow) — 4:20
 "The Fox" (Traditional, Paul Stookey, Mary Travers, Yarrow) —2:52
 "Somagawaza/Hey, Motswala" (Traditional) — 2:51
 "Inside" (Stookey, Paul Hill) — 5:18
 "Garden Song" (David Mallett) — 4:03
 "The Eddystone Light" (Traditional, Travers, Yarrow) — 2:27
 "I Know an Old Lady (Who Swallowed a Fly)" (Rose Bonne, Alan Mills) —6:36
 "Somos el Barco" (Lorre Wyatt) — 3:57
 "Pastures of Plenty" (Woody Guthrie) — 3:26
 "Medley: Home on the Range/Don't Ever Take Away My Freedom" (Traditional/Yarrow) — 5:51
 "Right Field" (Willy Welch) — 3:52
 "Poem for Erika/For Baby" (John Denver, Travers) —4:31
 "We Shall Overcome" (Guy Carawan, Frank Hamilton, Zilphia Horton, Pete Seeger) —4:49

The video includes the following additional songs:
Day is Done (played after Inside)
All Mixed Up (played after Home on the Range/Don't Ever Take Away My Freedom)
It's Raining (played after We Shall Overcome)
If I Had a Hammer
Blowin' in the Wind
This Land is Your Land

Personnel
Peter Yarrow — vocals, guitar, piano
Noel Paul Stookey — vocals, guitar
Mary Travers — vocals
Sue Evans — percussion
Richard Kniss – bass
Paul Prestopino - guitar, banjo, mandolin, harmonica, kalimba, Dobro

Production
Mastering - Ted Jensen at Sterling Sound, NYC

See also
Peter, Paul and Mommy

References 

1993 live albums
Peter, Paul and Mary albums
Warner Records live albums
Children's music albums